The men's long jump event at the 1985 IAAF World Indoor Games was held at the Palais Omnisports Paris-Bercy on 19 January.

Results

References

Long
Long jump at the World Athletics Indoor Championships